Penestola simplicialis is a moth in the family Crambidae. It was described by William Barnes and James Halliday McDunnough in 1913. It is found in Cuba and in the US state of Florida.

References

Moths described in 1913
Spilomelinae